Khayri Amar (born 6 September 1959) is a Jordanian sports shooter. He competed in the mixed skeet event at the 1984 Summer Olympics.

References

1959 births
Living people
Jordanian male sport shooters
Olympic shooters of Jordan
Shooters at the 1984 Summer Olympics
Place of birth missing (living people)